Costas M. Soukoulis is a Senior Scientist in the Ames Laboratory and a Distinguished Professor of Physics Emeritus at Iowa State University. He received his B.Sc. from University of Athens in 1974. He obtained his Ph.D. in Physics from the University of Chicago in 1978, under the supervision of Kathryn Liebermann Levin. From 1978 to 1981 he was at the Physics Department at University of Virginia. He spent 3 years (1981–84) at Exxon Research and Engineering Co. and since 1984 has been at Iowa State University (ISU) and Ames Laboratory. He has been part-time Professor at the Department of Materials Science and Technology of the University of Crete (2001-2011) and an associated member of IESL-FORTH at Heraklion, Crete, Greece since 1984.

Research 
Soukoulis and his collaborators at Ames Lab/ISU in 1990 and 1994, suggested photonic crystal designs (lattice diamond  and the woodpile structure, respectively), which gave the largest omnidirectional photonic band gaps. Many experimental groups all over the world still use his woodpile structure to fabricate photonic crystals at optical wavelengths, enhance the spontaneous emission and produce nanolasers with low threshold limit. Soukoulis and Wegener demonstrate magnetic responses and negative index of refraction at optical frequencies  in metamaterials, which do not exist in natural materials. His other researches includes light and Anderson localization, random lasers, graphene and plasmonics.

Awards and honours 

He is a Fellow of the APS, OSA and AAAS.
He is a recipient of Senior Humboldt Research Award (2002), and the first Frances M. Craig endowed chair in Physics Department at ISU (2007).
Soukoulis shared (Pendry, Smith, Özbay and Wegener) the 2005 Descartes Prize, awarded by the European Union, for contributions to metamaterials.
Honorary Doctorate from Vrije University in Brussels (2011).
Soukoulis, Pendry and Smith recipients of the 2013 APS James C. McGroddy Prize “for discovery of metamaterials.”
He is a recipient of the 2014 Max Born Award given by the OSA.
Soukoulis was selected in 2014, 2015 and 2016  among the Highly Cited Researchers published by Thomson-Reuters.
The Rolf Landauer Medal of the International ETOPIM Association (2015).

References

External links
Soukoulis AMES LAB-ISU Research Group
Soukoulis IESL-FORTH Research Group
Ames Laboratory Profile
Costas Soukoulis on Photonic Metamaterials

1951 births
Living people
21st-century American physicists
20th-century Greek physicists
National and Kapodistrian University of Athens alumni
University of Chicago alumni
Iowa State University faculty
Metamaterials scientists
Fellows of Optica (society)
Fellows of the American Physical Society
Fellows of the American Association for the Advancement of Science
Humboldt Research Award recipients
People from Corinthia